Kozhipporu is an Indian Malayalam-language Family Drama film, produced by V G Jayakumar under the banner J Pic Movies. The movie is written and directed by Jinoy Janardhanan and Jibit George, and starred Indrans, Pauly Valsan, Anjali Nair, Jolly Chirayath, Veena Nandakumar, Jinoy Janardhanan, Navajith Narayanan, Sarin Rishi, Sohan Seenulal and Praveen TJ. The soundtrack was composed by Bijibal. The film is edited by Appu N. Bhattathiri and has Ragesh Narayanan as the cinematographer. The film released in theatres on 6 March 2020.  However, following the theatre closedown owing to the Covid pandemic on 10th March 2020, the movie could not gain momentum at the movie theatres. Later, the movie released on Amazon Prime as a worldwide release.

One of the directors of the film, Jibit George died on 9 May 2020 following a cardiac arrest. He has also acted in the movie in a good role. The other director of the film, Jinoy Janardhanan, who has also acted in the film as one of the leads, is being praised for his natural acting and great direction. The film attained great attention for its unique making style and is being considered as one of the finely made movies based on village subjects.

Jinoy Janardhanan received the ' SPECIAL JURY AWARD FOR DIRECTION ' for Kozhipporu , as part of the 44th Film Critics Awards 2022.

Cast 
 Indrans as George
 Pauly Valsan as Mary
 Jolly Chirayath as Beena
 Sohan Seenulal as Varghese
 Anjali Nair as Jibina
 Veena Nandakumar as Aani
 Sarin Rishi as Keerappalli Antony
 Sankar Induchoodan as Tom
 Jinoy Janardhanan as Alby
 Navajith Narayanan as Jibit

 Praveen TJ as Gokul
 Jibit George as Kevin
 Nandini Sree as Chinjulu
 Geethi Sangeetha as Jaya
 Shiny Sarah as Chinjulu Mother
 Mary Eramallur as Sujatha
 Reshmi Anil as Sindhu
 Baby Sameeksha Nair as Agasteena/Agu
 V G Jayakumar as Broker
 Bride Visitors as Subair Peringodan, Stella Simon

Soundtrack 
The music and background score of the film is done by Bijibal and the lyrics was written by Vinayak Sasikumar.

 Aadhyathe Nokkil... - Bijibal, Aani aami vazhappally

 Vayadikkattu... - Uday Ramachandran

 Nalukaalippayalla... - Vaikom Vijayalakshmi

Release 
The film released on 6 March 2020.

References 

2020 films
2020s Malayalam-language films
Indian family films
Indian drama films
2020 drama films